The Lexington County Courthouse is a historic courthouse located at 139 East Main Street in Lexington, Lexington County, South Carolina.  This two story masonry building was constructed in 1939 using funds provided by the Public Works Administration, a Depression-era jobs program part of Franklin Roosevelt's New Deal.  The building was designed by J. Carroll Johnson and local architect  Jesse W. Wessinger. It exhibits a combination of restrained Classical styling with some Art Deco details that is rare among South Carolina courthouses. It was constructed in the place of the 1884 courthouse, which had been torn down.

The courthouse was added to the National Register of Historic Places in 2014.

See also
National Register of Historic Places listings in Lexington County, South Carolina

References

County courthouses in South Carolina
Courthouses on the National Register of Historic Places in South Carolina
Greek Revival architecture in South Carolina
Government buildings completed in 1838
Buildings and structures in Laurens County, South Carolina
National Register of Historic Places in Laurens County, South Carolina